Sebastian Faust (known as simply Faust) is a fictional character appearing in American comic books published by DC Comics, created by Mike Barr and Paul Pelletier. He was introduced in the 1993 Outsiders comic book series and is loosely based on the protagonist of the German legend who sold his soul to the Devil. The character is the son of the super-villain, Felix Faust, and is depicted as both a superhero and anti-villain.

As an infant, the Sebastian's soul was sold in a Faustian bargain by his father to regain his natural mystic ability by the demon Neibiros. Instead, the demon tricked Felix by granting the power to his son instead. Sebastian would be trained in the mystic arts by his father but later runs away due to his abusive ways. As an adult, Sebastian would strike out as a mystic superhero and paranormal investigator, his reputation in the DC Universe's superhero community often controversial due to his parentage, his callous methods, and expertise in black magic. He is later re-introduced in the DC Rebirth with a similar origin while portrayed as an anti-villain; a highly-regarded agent of the United States government and director of A.R..G.U.S's mystic branch, Sebastian later betrays the organization in order to save his terminally ill wife, putting him in conflict with Amanda Waller and her mystic derivative team, the Suicide Squad Black.

Publication history 

Sebastian Faust was first introduced in the Outsiders (Vol. 2) No. 1 Alpha in November 1993. Serving as the mystical member of the Outsiders team, he also guest starred alongside his teammates in Action Comics and Deathstroke the Terminator series. After the series' end in 1995, Sebastian made occasional appearances in other comics such as Superboy and the Ravers but later had a larger role in the 1999 Day of Judgement crossover; he would initially appear with a revised history and detailing involving the Enchantress in the DCU Villains Secret File and Origins comic released ahead of the event depicting him as a villain. In the actual crossover event, however, much of the details was changed though he still held a significance with Enchantress and was among the characters within the Sentinels of Magic team.

Faust would later star in the 2001 JLA: Black Baptism storyline as one of the main characters, his origin from the Outsiders run revised as well as the nature of his powers. Although the character was unused for a few years afterward, he would reappear in the 2006 Checkmate series, depicting under the new designated name of "Rook Gamma" as an elite operative & mystic consultant of the fictional intelligence agency, Checkmate. Sebastian would also have a supporting role in other crossovers, including the Brightest Day crossover, appearing in the Justice League of America and Justice Society of America series though seemingly no longer a member of Checkmate.

In 2016, the DC Rebirth event relaunched DC Comics' entire line of comic book titles. A rebooted version of Sebastian Faust debuted in the backdrop story of Suicide Squad: Black Files with a new origin, connections to the fictional agency, A.R.G.U.S,  and characterization as an eco-terrorist and anti-villain.

Characterization

Lack of soul 
During the 2001 "Black Baptism" storyline, details were added to Sebastian's backstory concerning his lack of a soul and the effects of his father's act of bartering it away; the lack of a soul caused Sebastian to lose his pupils, making his eyes completely black. To cover this, Faust uses aviators in order to prevent others from being disturbed by the sight. Faust cannot properly process emotions although he does not completely lack them, able to feel romantic love and familial friendships with those such as June Moone/Halo (former) and Blue Devil (the latter). In return, Sebastian was given the power to natural ability to initiate magical (the very power his father desperately craved to re-obtained) and could use soul-magic.

In Mystik U, the alternative universe's incarnation of Sebastian Faust follows some of the original comic's cue of; while lacking the ability to not process emotions, Faust's powers are demonic in nature and is difficult to control. He is unable to initiate any sort of intimate contact with individuals nor look directly at others without his aviators in fear of sucking their soul or draining them of their magic. Only powerful magicians like Zatanna could bypass his powers and abilities. His lack of a soul also causes him to possess a demonic form revealed when distressed.

Reputation
Prior to the New 52 reboot of the DC Universe, Sebastian started his superhero career in the Outsiders and has since garnered a poor reputation within the superhero community, being once considered a mystical threat in part due to being the son of infamous villain, Felix Faust. While considered a world-renowned soul mage, members of the Justice League (notably Superman and Batman) expressed hesitance & distrust in working with Faust. Only Wonder Woman & Blue Devil has shown unconditional trust in Faust among the Justice League. Faust himself attributes this to his powers affecting other's perception of him. Another contributing factor includes his attempt of sacrificing the Enchantress during the events of the Day of Judgement to reignite the flames of hell through an act of evil, an act that he holds immense remorse for despite his poor capability in processing emotions.

In DC Rebirth, his reputation is portrayed to being far more positive, considered a top notched governmental agent and a known hero among the superhero and mystic community. His turn from hero to villainy and eco-terrorism symbolizes the desperation he faced wanting to save both his unborn child and wife. Despite this direction in his life, the Justice League are portrayed to being sympathetic to Faust's circumstances and both expressed interest in helping him rehabilitate for his crimes and were unwilling to allow punishment at the hands of Suicide Squad handler, Amanda Waller, who was speculated to have planned to bring Faust into her magical division of the Suicide Squad.

Family relationships 
Sebastian's struggle into proving himself a hero stems from his own, dysfunctional family. He inherited an evil legacy, which he rejects:

 Felix Faust: As an infant, Felix regarded him as a bargaining tool. He was abusive to Sebastian growing up, as he taught him the mystic arts. In turn, Sebastian holds him in low regard and maintains a turbulent relationship with him. He disallowing Felix referring to him by his first name. Despite his father' evil, however, he respects him as a capable warlock.
 Fauna Faust: She was subjected to the same abuse as Sebastian and he also feels sympathy for her. Unlike Sebastian, Fauna followed a darker path compared to him. She worked with the Kobra Cult's elite team, Strike Force Kobra, and their father Felix. Despite their diverging paths, the two share a sibling rivalry when it comes to comparing their sorcerous skills.
 Sebastian and Fauna's unnamed mother: Sebastian's favored parent, he was confident that she would not have fallen into the sway of dark magic implored by her husband, Felix. Sebastian also told his father that only she is allowed to call him by his first name.

Romances 
Faust first formulated a romantic relationship with fellow Outsider member, Halo, whom Faust initially was portrayed as having feelings for and Halo skeptical and rejecting of his advances due to the mistrust the Outsiders team had for him initially. Eventually the two would pursue a romantic relationship, having first shared a kiss during a New Year's Eve celebration. He was also flirtatious with teammate Looker before his relationship with Halo solidified, both characters expressing finding one another attractive on several occasions.

In the Day of Judgement crossover, it was initially revealed that Sebastian and June Moone were slated to become lovers in a character entry in the DCU Villains Secret Files and Origins issue made for both characters ahead of the event. The actual crossover dealt with the two first meeting one another with Faust having come to be attracted to the June, only to have nearly slain her Enchantress personality to re-ignite the flames of Hell with a truly evil act. The ordeal riddled Faust with guilt, having begun developing feelings for her despite June's relationship with Alan Dell but ultimately decided to keep his distance. Their relationship is depicted differently in the later Black Baptism event, with June being an exception to Faust's usual inability to forming romantic attachments due to his lack of soul (revealed in the storyline). Still ridden with guilt over the events of Day of Judgement, Faust visits June frequently, as she was admitted to a hospital on due to the supposed death of her Enchantress personality slowly killing her and leaving her in a nearly unresponsive state, and repeatedly apologizes with lingering hope the two would reunite and continue a relationship should he find a way to reverse her circumstances. Eventually, Faust helps join June back with her Enchantress persona, birthing a new one known as "Soulsinger" who seemingly is moved by his later "sacrifice" during a battle with a powerful sorcerer.

In his new continuity incarnation in DC Rebirth, Faust mentions having met and fell in love with a dryad woman during his days as a director of A.R.G.U.S, the two having married and bore a son. However, a spell brought from work made his wife terminally ill. His wife's terminal sickness and unborn child's life at risk becomes the catalyst for him to eventually betray A.R.G.U.S in desperation, becoming an eco-terrorist with aims to rid the world of magic to reverse the effects of the terminal sickness spell passed onto his dyad wife, who is in a comatose state from a poison apple fed to her by Faust to buy himself more time to reverse her illness.

Fictional character biography

Origin 
Sebastian's original origin, detailed in the 1993 Outsider series, revealed him to be the British, elder son of Felix Faust and sister to supervillain, Fauna. As a child, he was taught in the mystic arts by his father, who often used familiars to perform magic. When Sebastian was old enough, Felix told his son he intended to give him an initiation into the mystic rites. During the "initiation", Sebastian learns that he was instead intended to be a sacrifice to a demon so Felix could regain the ability to initiate magic on his own. Instead, the demon granted Sebastian the ability to perform magic on his own at the cost of his magic. He ran away shortly after, causing Felix to attempt the same of his sister and for it to similarly fail and run away too.

Sebastian's origin was later revised, his soul instead having been sold as an infant (his original origin depicted him as a young teenager) by the demon, Nebiros, enemy of Swamp Thing and Blue Devil, and granted him soul-magic as a baby and giving him the power to initiate magic naturally though came with the drawback of an uncontrollable power of negative emotional projection, causing others to become more angry or tense the longer they are around Sebastian, making finding meaningful connections with others more difficult. Growing up, Felix's manipulative nature extended not only to Sebastian but his mother, who developed acute myeloid leukemia after birthing Fauna. Both of them were subjected to his attempts of seducing them to dark magic. Although Sebastian resisted his influence, his mother eventually began to slowly embrace it until she was killed in a car accident that only Sebastian and Fauna survived.

Outsiders vol. 2 (1993–1995) 
In the second volume of the Outsiders, Faust works with the Outsiders and assists the team when they reform under the threat of a vampire invasion of Markovia. When Technocrat's bodyguard Charlie Wylde is attacked by a bear, Faust saves him by merging the bear and guard together. However, the bear's violent side results in the deaths of innocent Markovian soldiers. Wylde goes on to fight and lose against his bestial half, and ends up in a zoo, tormented by Sebastian's sister, Fauna.

The Outsiders are on the run for some time, having been framed by the head vampire, Roderick, for the murder of the traitorous Queen Ilona. It is not known that Ilona is trying to kill the Outsiders. Eventually the team clears their names. Throughout his tenure, Faust is not trusted by many of his teammates. Despite this, he develops a romantic relationship with the innocent Halo. Soon, Felix, along with Fauna, attacks the team, drawing them into a different dimension. The team suffers various tortures, and survives only due to the flexible laws of reality in this realm. Faust leads an escape attempt. After the team breaks up, Faust tries to pursue a solo career.

Superboy and the Ravers (1996–1998) 
After the dissolution of the Outsiders team, Faust was a frequent guest at an intergalactic rave known as the "Event Horizon". When Raver hero Half-Life required new reanimated body parts, Faust agreed to help. While performing an incantation, Klarion the Witchboy sabotages his incantation and causes his ectoplasm to gain sentience for itself. When knocked out, Hero Cruz used the H-Dial to acquire Faust's mystic powers due to wishing for his assistance and banishes the entity that taken over his ectoplasm.

Day of Judgement (1999) 
During the 1999 DC Comics crossover event, Day of Judgment, Faust joins with other magical characters of the DC Universe to form the Sentinels of Magic. The denizens of Hell have invaded Earth, led by Asmodel, an angel with the powers of Spectre. Faust teams up with a varied group of superheroes, including Atom, Superman, Firestorm and Enchantress. They travel to Hell itself and eventually, to the City of Dis, Hell's center of power, to relight its fires. During the trip, the heroes are temporarily trapped under the frozen River Styx. Faust manages to rescue Enchantress first; since he has no soul, he is not tormented by the river's waters. Inside the city, the heroes discover the demon Nebiros, who has stayed behind to guard the frozen fires. In battle, Faust releases Blue Devil, whose bones he had apparently bought from a mysterious marketplace. Nebiros is slain due to Firestorm changing the water in his body to cement. Faust regains his soul. When the combined forces of the superheroes are not enough to relight the fires. Faust realizes what must be done and murders Enchantress, losing his soul, restarting the fires, and saving the Earth all at once.

In the aftermath of this event, Faust, having developed romantic feelings for Enchantress, would work to find ways of reviving Enchantress.

JLA: The Black Baptism (2001) 
Faust next appears during the Black Baptism event. Over the course of the story, he works both with and against the Justice League, before ultimately tapping their souls to stop the mighty sorcerer Hermes Trismegistus. Faust comes to realize his newfound friend, Blue Devil, is only staying with him because of the magical nature of his revival. Not willing to risk Blue Devil's safety, he eliminates the magical connection by plunging the last of Blue Devil's bones into his back. Following the battles, Faust fakes the death of both himself and his father. Blue Devil soon dies in battle against Hermes but is revived.

Checkmate (2006–2008) 
Faust was first mentioned in the 2006 Checkmate series as a consultant brought in by the intelligence organization to program magical capacities and defenses into their technological creation, Gideon-II. Later, he is revealed to be a member of the clandestine spy organization as one of their elite teams, "The Rooks". His callsign designation in Checkmate is "Rook Gamma". He is called upon to help neutralize a medical facility occupied by the Kobra Cult cultivating mutant, snake-like infants through the use of blood magic to be future soldiers of Kobra.

Justice League of America: The Dark Things (2010–2011) 
Faust would make an appearance in the aftermath of the Brightest Day as he helps the Justice League of America and Justice Society of America contain the chaos created from the revival of the Starheart, which causes metahumans of magical origin around the world to go wild. Using his expertise in the occult, he helps the Justice League and the JSA defeat the consciousness of the Starheart, who has taken the form of famed hero and Green Lantern Alan Scott and taken control of the newest incarnation of Doctor Fate, Kent V. Nelson. He also helps the superhero Jade come to terms with her resurrection and newfound heighten levels of power resulting from her coming back from the dead.

DC Rebirth
In the new continuity, Sebastian Faust retained elements of his previous version and more recent origin; he is still the older son of Felix Faust, the brother of Fauna Faust, and was once a member of the Outsiders at some point. Some conditions had changed compared to the previous continuity: Sebastian's soul was sold by Felix in an effort to gain immortality instead of magical powers, the newer version of Sebastian having natural abilities in performing magic but was granted soul magic from the attempted bargain much like before. Unlike the previous continuity, he is  American and no longer wears sunglasses, having pupils in his eyes despite possessing no soul. Unlike other continutities, he is also the grandson of Majika the Magnificient on his father's side.

Suicide Squad: Black Files: Fortune's Wheel (2016) 
In the Suicide Squad: Black Files limited series, Faust betrays America and A.R.G.U.S, stealing all of the magical artifacts A.R.G.U.S held as well as the Russian's own stockpile of mystical weaponry while assuming control of former mystical terrorist cell he fought against, Cerebus. In response, Amanda Waller assembled a sorcery team to counter the wizard but is unable to track their movements due to Faust's actions and enlists the aid of Klarion the Witch Boy, who tells her that she is to assemble a different team of magical users to battle Faust. With a mystical team, the Suicie Squad Black, consisting of El Diablo, Enchantress, Klarion the Witchboy, Gentleman Ghost, Azucar, and Dr. Thaumaturge, they find themselves opposed by Faust and his followers, including his majordomo Tiamat (the former Snargoyle of the previous sorcery team) and acolyte Wither. Faust planned to use multiple powerful mystic artifacts and assemble a weapon known as the Quellzorn, a mystic behemoth capable of feeding all magic to remove magic all together, having become disillusioned with its existence after both his experiences in seeing its capability to make others suffer and its personal effect on him due to having accidentally infected his dryad wife, pregnant with his unborn son, with a fatal mystic illness from a spell he caught in his work. Eventually, the team emerges victorious and Faust is defeated. He is later taken in by the Justice League to be rehabilitated.

The Other History of the DC Universe (2021) 
Faust would make a brief appearance in the Other History of the DC Universe within Katana's recount taking place during the Outsiders series. She recounted Violet's soul asserting herself over Gabriella Doe, the being who would take Violet's body. Katana would mention how Violet indulgance in pleasures included having a sexual relationship with Faust.

Powers and abilities
In his original incarnation, Faust was trained in the art of magic originally characterized as a warlock adept in black magic, a form of magic said to come at a high cost for its practitioners. He was considered among the most dangerous threats to the superhero community and one of the most dangerous magical practitioners on Earth, conisdered a peer to other dark magic users such as Enchantress and the Wizard. Later stories also portray Faust as specializing in soul magic like his father, a form of magic that allows controls over souls and affords a plethora of abilities such as being able to mimic other's special abilities through tapping into their souls, manipulating souls, and seeing other's aura. Through other forms of magic, he can perform feats such as travelling through shadows, illusion casting, telekinesis, protection sigils, teleportation, and more. These magical powers are provided from his demonic bargain despite his homo magi roots. In addition to his magical skills, he is a capable occult investigator and possess profound knowledge on the supernatural, being both better occult transcriber and surpasses his father in their shared skills and knowledge of soul magic. He is also skilled in covering his tracks, duplicity, espionage, hand-to-hand combat, and leadership. Faust is also highly resistant to mystical corruption and will eroding due to lacking a soul and having a strong will. Faust possesses a number of magical talismans, most notable his belt and magical pouches: a simple medium-sized cloth bag and leather belt outfitted with four canvas pouches hand-made out of conventional materials, high-grade steel. His magical pouches are mystically voluminous, holding more artifacts, energies, and surprises than the outward sizes would indicate.

In DC Rebirth, his background and nature of his magical abilities differ; he is mentioned to being considered both the top arcane operative in the United States and the most proficient magic user in A.R.G.U.S, having formerly led its arcane division. Unlike prior versions, he is mainly a practitioner in "logomancy" much like Zatanna and Zatara, allowing him to invoke magical effects and abilities by speaking the desired effects backwards. Some abilities he possess with logomany includes creating magical constructs, discharge magical energy blasts, mind control, casting energy shield, and endowing himself with superhuman durability. It is als implied that he still retains his mastery over soul magic.

Cost and weaknesses 
His magical powers comes with several drawbacks: with the practice of black magic, the Outisder comic series portrays the cost as some sort of "feedback", effects that would cause his spells to overload to his surrounding or cause physical pain to Faust. His soul magic inadvertently causes those around him are prone to becoming more tense & irritated with him the more he is around them, making it hard to formulate meaningful relationships as well as making it difficult to process emotions. Its effect on others varies.

Other versions

Mystik U
A college aged, alternate reality version of Sebastian Faust appears as one of the main characters in the DC limited series Mystik U written by Alisa Kwitney and illustrated by Mike Norton. In this reality, Sebastian Faust is one of Mystik U's celebrity students similar to Zatanna herself, serving as the sorceress's love interest in the series. Alongside other magical DC characters Enchantress, Sargon the Sorcerer, and original character Pia Morales, the students of the schools must figure out which one of them is to betray the others and become a force of evil known as the "Malevolence". Alisa used Sebastian Faust instead of familiar characters, John Constantine, because she found his backstory and character interesting. She also believed that while he and Constantine shared a history of demonic encounters and dilemmas and considered them a bad boy archetype, Faust's past is relatively unexplored compared to Constantine and Zatanna shared a parallel with their relationship to their respective fathers, Zatanna loving her famous father and Faust despising his infamous own.

References

External links
Cosmic Teams entry

DC Comics superheroes
DC Comics characters who use magic 
DC Comics characters who can teleport
DC Comics characters who have mental powers
DC Comics telekinetics
Characters created by Mike W. Barr
Comics characters introduced in 1993
Fictional characters who can manipulate darkness or shadows 
Fictional characters with elemental and environmental abilities
Fictional characters with death or rebirth abilities
Fictional characters with energy-manipulation abilities